Panimalar Engineering College is a postsecondary educational institution located in Chennai, Tamil Nadu, India focusing on engineering.

Undergraduate courses (4 years) 
Bachelor of Engineering degree in
Civil Engineering
Computer Science & Engineering
Information Technology
Electronics and Communication Engineering
Electrical & Electronics Engineering
Mechanical Engineering
Electronics & Instrumentation Engineering

Postgraduate courses (2 years) 
Master of Engineering
Master of Business Administration

References

External links 

Panimalar Website

Educational institutions established in 2000
Engineering colleges in Chennai
2000 establishments in Tamil Nadu